Church of Saint Margaret of Antioch, near Kopčany, Slovakia, is one of still standing churches for which the Greater Moravian origin is considered. It belongs to the oldest churches in Slovakia. The church was built probably in the 9th or 10th century and was first mentioned in 1329. It was used until the 18th century when a new church was built in the village of Kopčany.

Description 
The church is an original pre-Romanesque building. It is a single-cell church with small rectangular chancel to the east. The recent excavations have shown that the original church had a rectangular narthex at the west end of the church, and this contained a large stone lined tomb for the founding figure of the church. When the narthex was pulled down, the Gothic arch which formed the entry at the west end was inserted.

Since 1995, the church has been listed under Slovak cultural heritage. The outside of the church is openly accessible to the public. It stands in a field to the east of Kopčany and it is about 1.6 km from the major Greater Moravian site at Mikulčice, which is on the other side of the Morava river. It is approached by a road and is fairly close to the ruins of an 18th-century building, which was used along with former neighbouring lake for catching ducks.

History of the research
The small church near the Czech-Slovak border has long been considered a baroque chapel and its dating had a stormy development. The first architectural survey of the church was conducted in 1964 and refined dating to gothic period. In 1996, Viktor Ferus published a hypothesis about the Great Moravian origin of the building. During investigations in 2004, three graves and jewellery from the times of Great Moravia were found outside the church. The position of graves already respected the position of the church and the graves contained mortar from the building and the size and shape of fragments indices that they originate from the construction phase and not later destruction. In that times, the church was considered to be the only one still standing Great Moravian building in Czechia and Slovakia. The key challenge is to validate if the mortar could be introduced to the older horizon during excavating of the younger graves. In 2013, a collective of authors analysed a piece of wood from the building by dendrochronology, declaring that it can be dated to 951, which shifts the construction phase to the 2nd part of the 10th century, between the fall of the Great Moravia and the foundation of the Kingdom of Hungary. Neither these results were universally accepted and are under further validation.

Currently, archaeological research is focused on the reconstruction of the historical landscape and its settlements. Also during this period the church has undergone further restoration work and the old render has been stripped from the walls. This now shows that the two arched windows on the north side of the nave are original while the windows on the south side were altered in the later Romanesque period.

Gallery

References

Sources

External links 
 Research on the church (in Slovak)
 The church on the official site of Kopčany (in Slovak)
 Profile of the church (in Slovak)

Churches in Slovakia
Great Moravia
Romanesque architecture in Slovakia
9th-century architecture in Slovakia
10th-century architecture in Slovakia
9th-century churches
10th-century churches